Sidekicks is a 1992 American adventure action comedy-drama film  directed by Aaron Norris and starring Jonathan Brandis and Chuck Norris.

Plot
Barry Gabrewski is a troubled and bullied asthmatic boy who lives with his widowed father, Jerry (Beau Bridges), in Houston, Texas. A loner, Barry has vivid daydreams about being Chuck Norris' sidekick, battling against Norris' movie enemies, who are often personified by Barry's everyday bullies such as Randy Cellini (John Buchanan). Noreen Chan (Julia Nickson-Soul), his favorite teacher, often plays the damsel in distress in these daydreams.

Barry wants to learn martial arts, but is rejected by the arrogant dojo owner Kelly Stone (Joe Piscopo) for being too weak. Instead, he is taken on as a student by an old Chinese man called Mr. Lee (Mako), Noreen's sly uncle and the owner of a local Chinese restaurant, "Frying Dragon". Mr. Lee finds creative ways to teach Barry to defend himself from his bullies. Lee devises training methods that increase Barry's endurance, which helps his asthma. Lee also deduces Barry's hero worship of Norris, and from that at least some of Barry's daydreams. He creatively incorporates this into Barry's training, devising training scenarios that seem more dangerous than they are so that Barry will feel heroic for succeeding at them.

Lee enters himself, Barry, and Chan into a local team Karate tournament but is a bit stymied to learn that a team must have four members. Norris is attending the tournament as a guest and, at Lee's urging, Chan convinces Norris to join the team. Norris is both willing to help an ardent fan and has his own motivation for participating: he has encountered Stone on several occasions and wants to teach him "a lesson in humility". Barry is stunned to find himself working together with his hero.

The tournament involves four events: Breaking, Men's Weapons, Female Kata, and Freestyle fighting. Stone's team narrowly defeats Chan in the Female Kata, but Lee defeats Cellini, one of Stone's students, in Breaking. True to his word, Norris defeats Stone in Freestyle fighting, and Barry—aided by a vivid daydream—scores a victory in Men's Weapons. The result is a tie between Stone's team and Lee's team. In the tie-breaker, Lee is allowed to choose the participants, and chooses Barry and Cellini, saying Barry is the member of the team with "something to prove". Stone chooses the event, Breaking. Barry is dismayed to be confronting Cellini in the latter's best event, but Lee tilts the odds in Barry's favor by using a small amount of lighter fluid to set Barry's bricks on fire. Faced with a much more heroic-seeming task, Barry wins.

After the tournament, Barry is seen talking to Norris, thanking him for his help. Norris vanishes, and it is implied that Barry has found the strength to live his life without the need for his daydreams. A young boy in a wheelchair finds Barry's Chuck Norris magazine and reacts with an excited "Wow!"

Cast

 Jonathan Brandis as Barry Gabrewski
 Chuck Norris as himself
 Beau Bridges as Jerry Gabrewski
 Mako as Mr. Lee
 Joe Piscopo as Kelly Stone
 Danica McKellar as Lauren
 John Buchanan as Randy Cellini
 Richard Moll as Mr. Horn
 Julia Nickson-Soul as Ms. Noreen Chan
 Gerrit Graham as Mr. Mapes
 Eric Norris as Biker Punk

NOTE: Nickson-Soul's character-name is an inside reference to Chuck Norris's movie An Eye For an Eye, in which Mako portrayed James Chan (the father of a murdered journalist, who teams up with Norris' character to hunt down her killers).

Production

Filming
 810 Zola Rd., Houston, Texas. (Barry's home)
 Lamar High School (Houston, Texas)
 Tranquility Park
 Wortham Theater Center
 Williams Waterwall
 Allen's Landing
 Texas Southern University
 Westchester Junior High, Spring Branch  (Demolished, 1994?) (Houston, Texas)

Sidekicks was filmed primarily in Houston, TX. It was the pet project of well-known Houston furniture outlet owner Jim "Mattress Mac" McIngvale, who (in partnership with Chuck Norris and his "Kick Drugs out of Schools" campaign) invested 8 million dollars in producing this movie. Chuck Norris, who had appeared in many local television commercials for McIngvale, suggested the idea of creating this film, and "Mac" agreed to finance and produce it. In McIngvale's book, Always Think Big, he states going into film and producing was "extremely hard work".

Reception

Box office
The film debuted at No. 2 at the box office.  It grossed $17,180,393 during its domestic release.

Critical response
The film received largely negative reviews from critics.  Based on 19 reviews gathered, the film has a 26% from Rotten Tomatoes, with an average score of 4/10.

See also
 Chuck Norris filmography
 List of American films of 1992

Notes

External links
 
 
 

1990s teen films
1992 films
American coming-of-age films
American martial arts films
American teen films
Cultural depictions of Chuck Norris
Films directed by Aaron Norris
Films scored by Alan Silvestri
Films set in Houston
Films shot in Houston
Films produced by Don Carmody
Martial arts tournament films
1990s English-language films
1990s American films